Derek Hodgson (born 1941) is a former Welsh trade union leader.

Born in Cardiff, Hodgson attended St Mary's Catholic School.  He left at the age of fifteen, and turned down a place at agricultural college for a job delivering telegrams for the Post Office.  He joined the Union of Post Office Workers and became the union representative for the telegram boys.  Part of his job involved delivering dispatch boxes to George Thomas, who encouraged Hodgson to join the Labour Party.

In his youth, Hodgson was a keen welterweight boxer, coached by Eddie Thomas.  He considered turning professional, but he broke his leg in a motorbike accident at the age of nineteen and thereafter spent his spare time playing rugby and horse riding.

In 1963, Hodgson was appointed as a full-time union official, and in 1978 he was elected to its national executive.  In 1987, he was promoted to become national organiser, then became deputy general secretary in 1991.  In 1993, he stood to become general secretary of the union, by then known as the Union of Communication Workers (UCW), but was defeated by Alan Johnson.  Hodgson was also elected to the National Executive Committee of the Labour Party, and became a close ally of John Smith, meeting with him the night before Smith died.

The UCW became part of the Communication Workers' Union, and in 1997, Hodgson was elected to replace Johnson as its joint general secretary.  He was highly critical of Johnson, stating that when he took over, "we had the worst record in industrial relations of any union and a bloody mess to sort out".  He restructured the union, soon becoming sole general secretary, and prioritised a campaign against the privatisation of the Post Office.  However, he was keen to avoid any suggestion of being a left-winger, claiming that he was "more of a [John] Prescott man".

Hodgson retired in 2001.

Since retiring Derek moved up North and now lives on the Lancashire coast with his wife Sheena, he is also a keen golfer.

References

1941 births
Living people
General Secretaries of the Communication Workers Union (UK)
Labour Party (UK) people
Trade unionists from Cardiff